Asemospiza is a genus of South American birds in the tanager family Thraupidae.

Taxonomy and species list
These species were formerly placed in the genus Tiaris. A molecular phylogenetic study published in 2014 found that Tiaris was polyphyletic.  In the resulting reorganization to create monophyletic genera, these two species were assigned to a new genus Asemospiza with the sooty grassquit as the type species. The name combines the Ancient Greek ἄσημος/asēmos meaning "without marks" with σπίζα/spiza meaning "finch". These two species are in the subfamily Coerebinae and form a sister clade to the Darwin's finches.

The species in the genus are:

References

 
Bird genera
Taxa named by Kevin J. Burns (ornithologist)
Taxa named by Philip Unitt
Taxa named by Nicholas A. Mason